Gautam Vaghela (5 January 1936 – 6 April 2010) was an Indian artist.

His early art education was at the Sir Jamsetjee Jeejebhoy School of Art in Bombay. He later he went on to train in fresco and mural techniques in Banasthali, Rajasthan. From 1962 to 1994 he was associated with the Weaver's Service Centre at the government of India's Ministry of Textiles. He retired as Director, Coordination and Design Exports for the Centres and Indian Institutes of Handloom Technology. The W.S.C's had artists working closely with weavers for the development of modern textile designs, and it was at the Centre that Vaghela interacted with artists including K.G. Subramanyan, Prabhakar Barwe and Ambadas.

Vaghela has illustrated several books including The Story of Dance: Bharata Natyam by Krishna Sahai and Another India: An Anthology of Indian Contemporary Fiction and Poetry with British painter Howard Hodgkin. In more than four decades as an artist and designer, he has exhibited all over India and overseas, including at the 1966 Biennale de Paris and the 1967 São Paulo Art Biennial.

Awards
1982: Padma Shri
1990: Maharashtra Gaurav Puraskar

Selected illustrations
The Story of Dance: Bharata Natyam by Krishna Sahai  (2003) 
Another India: An Anthology of Indian Contemporary Fiction and Poetry (1990)

References

1936 births
2010 deaths
Indian illustrators
Indian male painters
Recipients of the Padma Shri in arts
Sir Jamsetjee Jeejebhoy School of Art alumni
20th-century Indian painters
20th-century Indian male artists